The 6 Hours of Bogotá is an automobile endurance race that is held annually in December at the Autódromo de Tocancipá,  north of Bogotá, in the city's metropolitan area. It is the most prestigious endurance motorsport race in Colombia, it brings together national and international drivers and teams and has been held since 1986. It is held on the first Saturday of December each year. It is managed as an independent race, and the final race of the Campeonato Nacional de Automovilismo (CNA).

History
The race had its first edition in mid-1986 as a result of the idea of having a long-term race in the country. Its first edition was called the "Premio Wagner Cofre Motor" and it was held over one hundred laps, in the Tocancipá Circuit of 2040 meters. This was disputed by small-cylinder touring cars along with cars with V8 engines. Its first winner was Pablo Gómez in a Simca. For the second edition in 1987, it was decided to change the one hundred laps for a duration of three hours. In 1988, it went to its current duration of six hours.

Race winners

References

Motorsport in Colombia
Sport in Bogotá
Sports car races
Touring car races
Endurance motor racing
Recurring sporting events established in 1986
1986 establishments in Colombia